A penal treadmill (penal  treadwheel or everlasting staircase) was a treadmill with steps set into two cast iron wheels. These drove a shaft that could be used to mill corn, pump water or connect to a large fan for resistance.

Penal treadmills were used in prisons in the early Victorian Britain as a method of exerting hard labour, a form of punishment prescribed in the prisoner's sentence.

History
The prison treadwheel was introduced in 1818 by the British engineer Sir William Cubitt (1785–1861) as a means of usefully occupying convicts in the prisons at Bury St Edmunds and Brixton. There had been simple two-man treadmills in prisons before which were used for raising water and grain preparation: these were on a large scale and for a different purpose. Cubitt observed prisoners lying around in idleness, and opined that it was better "reforming offenders by teaching them habits of industry." It was intended to be pointless and to punish; resistance to the motion was provided by straps and weights. Later when prison philosophy had changed it became acceptable to use the energy to power pumps and corn mills. 44 prisons in England adopted this form of hard labour to grind grain. Others remained "grinding the wind".

By the Prison Act 1865, every male prisoner over 16 sentenced to hard labour had to spend at least three months of his sentence in Labour Order. This consisted primarily of the treadmill, or, as an alternative, the crank machine. This consisted of a small wheel, like the wheel of a paddle steamer, and a handle turned by the prisoner made it revolve in a box partially filled with gravel.

In 1895 there were 39 treadmills and 29 cranks in use in English prisons, and these had diminished to 13 and 5 respectively in 1901. The use of treadwheels was abolished in Britain in 1902 by the Prison Act 1898.

America adopted the treadwheel in 1822, installing one in Bellevue Hospital in New York City. A second was erected in 1823, for the cost of $3000 at the Old Newgate Prison in East Granby, Connecticut. A total of only four were built, three of which were quickly abandoned.

Description
The prison  treadwheel was a long wooden cylinder with metal framing. As the prisoner put his weight on the step it depressed the wheel, and he was forced to step onto the step above, it was an "everlasting staircase". There would be 18 to 25 positions on the wheel, each separated by a wooden partition so each prisoner had no contact with the adjacent prisoner and saw only the wall in front. They walked in silence for six hours a day, taking 15 minutes on the wheel followed by a 5-minute break.

In popular culture
On their 1977 album Storm Force Ten, folk-rock band Steeleye Span included an English folk song called "The Treadmill Song" describing a prisoner's lot at hard labour, including the treadmill.  In Charles Dickens' novel A Christmas Carol Ebenezer Scrooge references the treadmill, which he describes as "useful", and in his novel Bleak House the lawyer Mr. Tulkinghorn threatens Hortense with imprisonment with treadmills "for women".
The 1997 film Wilde shows Oscar Wilde put to the treadmill as part of his hard labour punishment.

References
Notes

Footnotes

References

Ethically disputed judicial practices
Penal labour
Animal engines